"I'm Not Through Loving You Yet" is a song co-written and recorded by American country music artist Conway Twitty.  It was released in April 1974 as the first single and title track from his album I'm Not Through Loving Yet.  The song peaked at number 3 on the Billboard Hot Country Singles chart. It also reached number 1 on the RPM Country Tracks chart in Canada.  The song was written by Twitty and L. E. White.

A 1980 cover by Pam Rose also made the country charts, reaching No. 60 that year.

Personnel
Carol Lee Cooper and L.E. White overdubbed their vocals November 6, 1973, at Bradley's Barn.

Conway Twitty — vocals
Carol Lee Cooper, L.E. White — vocals
Harold Bradley — 6-string electric bass guitar
Ray Edenton — acoustic guitar
Johnny Gimble — fiddle
John Hughey — steel guitar
Tommy Markham — drums
Grady Martin — electric guitar
Bob Moore — bass
Hargus "Pig" Robbins — piano

Chart performance

References

1974 singles
Conway Twitty songs
Songs written by Conway Twitty
Songs written by L. E. White
Song recordings produced by Owen Bradley
MCA Records singles
1974 songs